Walter Bernstein (August 20, 1919 – January 23, 2021) was an American screenwriter and film producer who was blacklisted by the Hollywood movie studios in the 1950s because of his views on communism. Some of his notable works included The Front (1976), Yanks (1979), and Little Miss Marker (1980). He was a recipient of Writers Guild of America Awards including the Ian McLellan Hunter award and the Evelyn F. Burkey award.

Early life
Bernstein was born on August 20, 1919, in Brooklyn, New York, to Eastern European immigrants Hannah (née Bistrong) and Louis Bernstein, a teacher. He studied at the Erasmus High School in Flatbush, Brooklyn. After graduating from high school, he went on to study a six-month immersive language course at University of Grenoble, where he lived with a French family who were acquaintances of his father. It was here that he was exposed first to communist ideas. He returned to the United States and attended Dartmouth College, where he gained his first writing job, as a film reviewer for the campus newspaper, and where he joined the Young Communist League. He graduated from Dartmouth in 1940.

In February 1941, Bernstein was drafted into the U.S. Army. Eventually attaining the rank of Sergeant, he spent most of World War II as a correspondent on the staff of the Army newspaper Yank, filing dispatches from Iran, Palestine, Egypt, North Africa, Sicily, and Yugoslavia. He wrote of his experiences in Palestine in an article titled "War and Palestine".

Bernstein wrote a number of articles and stories based on his experiences in the Army, some of which originally appeared in The New Yorker. These were collected in Keep Your Head Down, his first book, published in 1945.

Career
Bernstein first came to Hollywood in 1947, under a ten-week contract with writer-producer-director Robert Rossen at Columbia Pictures, working uncredited for All the King's Men. After that he worked for producer Harold Hecht, which resulted in his first screen credit, shared with Ben Maddow, for their adaptation of the Gerald Butler novel for the film Kiss the Blood Off My Hands (1948) for Universal. He subsequently returned to New York, where he continued writing for The New Yorker and other magazines, and eventually found work as a scriptwriter in the early days of live television.

Blacklist
In 1950, because of his numerous left-wing political affiliations and related activities, his name appeared in the publication Red Channels, resulting in his blacklisting by Hollywood studios as a part of the McCarthy era actions against individuals with communist affiliations. Throughout the 1950s, however, he managed to continue writing for television, both under pseudonyms and through the use of "fronts" (non-blacklisted individuals who would permit their names to appear on his work). In this manner, he contributed to television programs of the era, including Danger, the CBS News docudrama series You Are There, and the mystery series Colonel March of Scotland Yard. (It has been incorrectly stated in some sources that Bernstein's blacklisting resulted from "unfriendly" testimony given to HUAC in 1951, but, in fact, he was not subpoenaed by the committee until the late 1950s, and never actually testified.)

Rebound
Bernstein's screenwriting career began to rebound from the blacklist when director Sidney Lumet hired him to write the screenplay for the Sophia Loren movie That Kind of Woman (1959). From then on Bernstein was able to work openly on films such as Paris Blues (1961) and Fail-Safe (1964). He worked uncredited on the screenplays of The Magnificent Seven (1960) and The Train (1964), and was one of several writers who worked on the script for the ill-fated Something's Got to Give, which was left uncompleted at the time of the death of its star, Marilyn Monroe, in 1962.

Paris Blues was his first feature film collaboration with director Martin Ritt, a friend since the 1940s (and himself a victim of the Hollywood blacklist); they subsequently worked together on The Molly Maguires (1970), which Bernstein also co-produced with Ritt, and The Front (1976). The latter film is a drama about a restaurant cashier (played by Woody Allen) with no real talent or political convictions who is hired to act as a "front" for blacklisted television writers during the 1950s. It earned Bernstein an Academy Award nomination for Best Original Screenplay and the WGA Award for Best Drama Written Directly for the Screen. Bernstein made a cameo appearance in Allen's film Annie Hall (1977).

Bernstein was nominated for the WGA for Best Comedy Adapted from Another Medium for Semi-Tough (1977) and for a BAFTA Award for Best Screenplay for Yanks (1979). He stepped behind the camera as director of his only feature film, Little Miss Marker (1980), a remake of the 1934 film based on the Damon Runyon story of the same name. He also wrote and directed one segment of the made-for-TV movie Women & Men 2: In Love There Are No Rules (1991).

Teaching
Bernstein served until his death in 2021 as an adjunct visiting instructor and screenwriting thesis adviser at New York University's Tisch School of the Arts in the Department of Dramatic Writing.

Bernstein also served as a visiting screenwriting instructor at Columbia University School of the Arts in the 1990s.

Publication
Bernstein's book, Inside Out: A Memoir of the Blacklist, was published in 1996. In his memoirs, he recounts joining the Young Communist League at Dartmouth College in 1937, and the Communist Party itself the year after he left the U.S. Army.

Personal life
Bernstein was married four times, with the first three marriages to Marva Spelman, Barbara Lane, and Judith Braun, ending up in divorces. He married literary agent Gloria Loomis in 1988. He had two children with his first wife Marva Spelman, Joan Bernstein and Peter Spelman; three children with his third wife Judith Braun, Nicholas Bernstein, Andrew Bernstein, and Jake Bernstein. He died of pneumonia on January 23, 2021, at the age of 101.

Other awards
 In 1994, he received the Ian McLellan Hunter Memorial Award for Lifetime Achievement in Writing, from the Writers Guild of America East.
 In 2008, the WGAE presented Bernstein with their Evelyn F. Burkey Award, given "in recognition of contributions that have brought honor and dignity to writers everywhere."

References

General references

Inline citations

External links

 
 Ávila, Molly Rose; Zucker, Gregory (July 11, 2011). "In Conversation: Red Memories". The Brooklyn Rail.

1919 births
2021 deaths
American film producers
American male screenwriters
Dartmouth College alumni
Members of the Communist Party USA
Hollywood blacklist
Jewish American screenwriters
Writers from Brooklyn
United States Army personnel of World War II
American centenarians
Screenwriters from New York (state)
United States Army non-commissioned officers
Military personnel from New York City
Deaths from pneumonia in New York City
20th-century American screenwriters
20th-century American male writers
American male non-fiction writers
20th-century American memoirists
Men centenarians